Gerald Thomas Francis Summers (born 4 October 1933) was an English professional football player with West Bromwich Albion, Sheffield United, Hull City and Walsall; he then went into football coaching with Oxford United, Gillingham, Derby County and Leicester City.

Summers joined Sheffield United in May 1957, Joe Mercer having signed him from West Bromwich Albion. He played 260 League games as attacking wing-half before moving to Hull City in 1964, and then to Walsall. He was manager at Oxford United (1969–1975) and Gillingham (1975–1981) and coached at Derby County and Leicester City.

References

Hull City A.F.C. players
Sheffield United F.C. players
West Bromwich Albion F.C. players
Gillingham F.C. managers
Oxford United F.C. managers
1933 births
Living people
Footballers from Birmingham, West Midlands
People from Small Heath, Birmingham
Association football wing halves
English footballers